The 1130 papal election (held February 14) was convoked after the death of Pope Honorius II and resulted in a double election. Part of the cardinals, led by Cardinal-Chancellor Aymeric de la Chatre, elected Gregorio Papareschi as Pope Innocent II, but the rest of them refused to recognize him and elected Cardinal Pietro Pierleoni, who took the name of Anacletus II. Although Anacletus had the support of the majority of the cardinals, the Catholic Church considers Innocent II as the legitimate Pope, and Anacletus II as Antipope.

The double election was a result of the growing tensions inside the College of Cardinals concerning the policy of the Holy See towards the Holy Roman Empire, initiated by the Concordat of Worms (1122), which ended the investiture controversy. Several, particularly older, cardinals considered the compromise achieved in Worms as desertion of the principles of the Gregorian Reform, and inclined to accept it only as a tactical move. They supported the traditional alliance of the Papacy with the Normans in southern Italy. Some of them were connected to old monastic centers in Southern Italy such as Montecassino. One of their leaders was Cardinal Pierleoni, representative of one of the most powerful families of Rome.

The opposite faction was headed by Aymeric de la Chatre, who was named cardinal and chancellor of the Holy See shortly after signing the Concordat of Worms and was one of the main architects of the new policy. He and his adherents looked at the compromise as a good solution both for the Church and the Emperor, and did not trust the Norman vassals of the Holy See, who expressed some expansionist tendencies. It seems that at least some major representatives of this faction had strong connections to the "new spirituality", meaning the new religious orders such as regular canons. Besides, they were allied with the Roman family of Frangipani, opponents of the Pierleoni family.

In the last weeks of the lifetime of Pope Honorius II the cardinals, fearing the possible schism, made an agreement that the new pope would be elected by the commission of eight of them, including two cardinal-bishops, three cardinal-priests and three cardinal-deacons.

Cardinals

The College of Cardinals had probably 43 (or 42) members in February 1130. It seems that no more than 37 (36) were present at Rome on the death of Honorius II:

Probably six cardinals were absent from Rome:

Preparations for the election

The parties of the College of Cardinals were of different sizes. The party of Aymeric was smaller, with 19 members, while that of his opponents 24, but the party of the Chancellor was certainly better organized.

One of the undeniable aspects of that division is that the Anacletans were mainly senior cardinals, veterans of the investiture controversy, created either by Paschalis II or early in the pontificate of Callixtus II, while Innocentine cardinals with few exceptions were created after Concordat of Worms (1122), which established peace with the Emperor. Out of nineteen cardinals created before 1122, only five supported the Chancellor, while out of twenty four appointed from that time onwards as many as fourteen. The other possible reasons for such radical tensions in the College (e.g. national divisions, connections to different spiritual centres) are widely discussed by historians without final conclusion.

In the elected committee the party of Aymeric had 5 members out 8. This was due to the way of their election – each of the three cardinalatial orders had to elect their own representatives. Although adherents of Aymeric were in the minority in the whole College, they had a majority among cardinal-bishops and cardinal-deacons, while their opponents were mainly cardinal-priests. Therefore, the faction of the Chancellor acquired a majority in the electoral body

The following cardinals were elected to the committee (the opponents of Aymeric are denoted with †):
Cardinal-Bishops (two adherents of Aymeric)
Guillaume, Bishop of Palestrina 
Corrado della Suburra, Bishop of Sabina
Cardinal-Priests (two opponents and one adherent of Aymeric)
Pietro Pierleoni, O.S.B.Cluny, Priest of S. Maria in Trastevere †
Pietro Pisano, Priest of S. Susanna †
Pietro Ruffino, Priest of SS. Silvestro e Martino
Cardinal-Deacons (two adherents and one opponent of Aymeric)
Gregorio Papareschi, C.R.L., Deacon of S. Angelo in Pescheria 
Aymeric de la Chatre, C.R.S.M.R., Deacon of S. Maria Nuova and Chancellor of the Holy See
Gionata, Deacon of SS. Cosma e Damiano †

Death of Honorius II and the election of Innocent II

Honorius II died in the night 13/14 February 1130 in the Roman monastery of S. Gregorio, after a long illness. Cardinal Aymeric arranged a hasty burial there and immediately called the members of the committee to the monastery to proceed for the election of a new pope. But Cardinals Pierleoni and Gionata, realising that the commission certainly would elect a supporter of the Chancellor, withdrew from it hoping that a lack of quorum would prevent it from functioning. But Aymeric ignored this fact and the commission assembled with six members only. Despite the protests of Cardinal Pietro Pisano, who was a distinguished canonist, the committee elected one of its members, Cardinal Gregorio Papareschi of S. Angelo, who accepted the election and took the name Innocent II. He was enthroned in the Lateran Basilica early in the morning on February 14. His election was almost immediately recognized by six other cardinals: two bishops (Giovanni of Ostia and Mathieu of Albano) and four priests (Joselmo of S. Cecilia, Petrus of S. Anastasia and Giovanni of S. Crisogono; the identity of the fourth one is uncertain, but most probably it was Gerardo of S. Croce). In a short time they were joined also by the next eight cardinals.

The election of Anacletus II

The majority of the cardinals, however, did not recognize Innocent II under the influence of Pietro Pisano, who, as a distinguished canonist, declared that his election was invalid. On February 14 in the morning the opponents of Aymeric and his candidate assembled under the leadership of Pietro Pierleoni in the church of S. Marco to elect the new Pope. Initially, Cardinal Pierleoni proposed the election of the Dean of the College Pietro Senex of Porto, but he refused to accept the papal dignity.  Then the cardinals unanimously elected Pierleoni himself, who took the name of Anacletus II.

It is not known how many cardinals elected Anacletus II. The decree proclaiming his election issued on the same day was subscribed by 14 cardinals:
Bishop Pietro Senex of Porto, 
Priests Gregorio de Ceccano of SS. Apostoli, Saxo of S. Stefano, Pietro of S. Marcello, Comes of S. Sabina, Gregorio of S. Balbina, Crescenzio of SS. Marcellino e Pietro, Lectifredo of S. Vitale, Pietro Pisano of S. Susanna, Matteo of S. Pietro in Vincoli and Enrico of S. Prisca, 
Deacons Gregorio of S. Eustachio, Gionata of SS. Cosma e Damiano and Angelo of S. Maria in Domnica.

It is not known whether the remaining five adherents of Pierleoni, who are believed to have been present at Rome, participated in the electoral proceedings. There is no doubt, however, that the lesser clergy of Rome was represented in the election. The electoral decree of Anacletus II bears the subscriptions of some of them, including Subdeacon Gregorio, primicerius scholae cantorum, who was appointed Cardinal-Deacon of S. Maria in Aquiro the following February 21, and Rainiero, Archpriest of the Patriarchal Liberian Basilica.

Division of the College of Cardinals

The double election resulted with the open split of the College of Cardinals into two parties. Their compositions can be established in the following way:
Liber Pontificalis mentions the names of 16 cardinals who supported Innocent II from the very beginning. To them should be added two other cardinals (Guido of Tivoli and Rustico of S. Ciriaco), whose attitude is attested by the fact that they subscribed the bulls of Innocent II. 
The obedience of Anacletus II may be reconstructed basing on the letter addressed to king Lothair III of Germany by his cardinals soon after his coronation. This letter bears the subscriptions of 27 cardinals, including five created by Anacletus II on February 21, a Friday of the ember week. To them should be added also cardinal Oderisio of S. Agata, who later subscribed the bulls issued by Anacletus II.

Therefore, at the beginning of the schism 18 cardinals belonged to the College of Innocent II, and 28 to the College of Anacletus II.

The Innocentine cardinals, who are not mentioned by Liber Pontificalis, and the Anacletan, who did not subscribe the letter to king Lothair, are denoted with †.

Stefano Stornato joined the obedience of Innocent II no later than 1132; Lectifredo of S. Vitale and Giovanni Dauferio did the same in 1133, Pietro Pisano in 1137, and Desiderio of S. Prassede shortly before the end of the schism in 1138. It seems that ca. 1135 Comes of S. Sabina also abandoned Anacletus II.

The schism

Both popes were consecrated and crowned on the same day, February 23. Innocent II received episcopal consecration from Cardinal Giovanni of Ostia in the church S. Maria Nuova, the titular deaconry of Chancellor Aymeric. Anacletus II was consecrated by Cardinal Pietro of Porto in the Vatican Basilica, which means that Anacletus took the advantage in the city from the very beginning. Almost all Roman aristocracy (with the significant exception of the Frangipani family), the majority of the lesser clergy and the people of Rome recognized Anacletus II and at the end of May Innocent II had to flee to France. After his defection to France even the Frangipani submitted to Anacletus.

In France, however, Innocent II found a strong ally in the person of Bernard of Clairvaux. Under Bernard’s influence, almost all European monarchs and episcopates recognized the exiled Innocent II. Anacletus II, although he controlled Rome and the Patrimony of St. Peter, received the support only of the Normans of southern Italy, Scotland, Aquitaine, some cities in northern Italy (incl. Milan), and perhaps Outremer and probably also Poland.

Both elections were irregular, because they contradicted the rules established by the decree In Nomine Domini in 1059, but both sides defended the legality of the respective pontificates. The adherents of Anacletus argued that he was elected by the majority of the cardinals, lower clergy and the people of Rome. The partisans of Innocent II answered that Innocent II was elected by majority of the cardinal-bishops, who according to the decree In Nomine Domini had to play the preeminent role in the election. Their opponents answered with another version of the decree (false, but very popular at the time), which stated that the pope was elected by "cardinals" (meaning cardinal-priests and deacons), while cardinal-bishops could only express their approval or disapproval. Both parties used, by analogy, the Benedictine rule, which stated that in the case of a double election for abbot, the valid election was the one made by "the sounder part" (sanior pars) of the electors – but there was no consensus which part of the College was "sounder" in this case.

Decisive for the verdict about the legality of both pontificates were not the legal arguments, but the attitude of the Catholic world, which had almost universally recognized Innocent II. His main supporters were Abbot Bernard of Clairvaux, Archbishop of Magdeburg Norbert of Xanten and King Lothair III of Germany. The few secular lords who had initially supported Anacletus gradually abandoned his cause as lost; only King Roger II of Sicily, who had received the crown from Anacletus in exchange for support, stood at his side to the very end. Although Anacletus II was able to retain the control of the city of Rome and the Patrimony of St. Peter until his death in January 1138, his successor quickly made his submission to Innocent II, who is now regarded as true Pope.

References

Bibliography

Anton Chroust, Das Wahldekret Anaklets II, (in:) Mitteilungen des Instituts für österreichische Geschichtsforschung, vol. 28, 1907, p. 348–355

12th-century elections
1130
1130 in Europe
12th-century Catholicism
Schisms in Christianity
Lothair III, Holy Roman Emperor